The Senator was the biggest and oldest bald cypress tree in the world, located in Big Tree Park, Longwood, Florida. The destruction of the tree was the unintentional result of a fire set at its base.

Background
As of 1993, the Senator was estimated to be 3,500 years old, making it the 5th oldest tree in the world.

History

The Seminoles and other Native American groups who lived throughout Central Florida used this tree as a landmark. In the late 19th century, the tree attracted visitors even though much of the surrounding land was swamp; reaching the tree was done by leaping from log to log. A walkway was later constructed by the Works Progress Administration.

The Senator was named for Florida State Senator Moses Overstreet, who donated the tree and surrounding land to Seminole County for a park in 1927. In 1929, former US President Calvin Coolidge reportedly visited The Senator and dedicated the site with a commemorative bronze plaque. A photo that was published of Coolidge and his wife near the tree was reported by the Orlando Sentinel to have been doctored. The plaque and portions of an iron fence were stolen by vandals in 1945 and never recovered.

Fire and collapse
On January 16, 2012, a fire was reported at the top of the Senator tree, which burned from the inside out, "like a chimney." Firefighters arrived to try to extinguish the blaze, but the tree collapsed.

On February 28, 2012, the Florida Division of Forestry said they arrested a 26-year-old woman on suspicion of starting the Senator fire. The suspect stated that she regularly went to the tree site when the park was closed. On the night of January 16, 2012, she lit a fire with debris so that she could see the crystal meth that she was trying to smoke but the fire got out of control. Officials said that they found images of the fire being started on the woman's laptop and on her cellphone. Following a plea agreement resulting in a suspended sentence, she was ordered to jail for 30 months for violation of probation in 2016.

Post-fire

In October 2013, Seminole County officials allowed a small, select group of artists and woodworkers to create works of art for the county from the charred remains of the Senator.  Artisans have created a variety of items, including vases, pens, ornate flutes, and sculptures.  Some of the items have been made available for sale at art shows, and officials are working toward making both a permanent and traveling exhibit with some of the artifacts.

On March 2, 2014, Big Tree Park was re-opened to the public after being closed for almost a year after the fire that destroyed The Senator. A memorial was constructed which includes signage along the newly renovated boardwalk, a playground piece that mimics a bald cypress tree stump and a clone of The Senator that was planted near the playground.  The name for the clone is "The Phoenix".

A clone of the Senator was located, and currently is growing at the entrance to Big Tree Park. The clone was provided by Marvin Buchanan. Buchanan had secured some branches after the Senator suffered wind damage and cloned it on his tree farm.

Lady Liberty Tree

Located  from where The Senator stood is another old cypress in the same Big Tree Park named Lady Liberty that was named companion tree to The Senator.

See also
List of oldest trees
List of individual trees

References

External links

 Big Tree Park in Longwood, FL
 The Senator – Florida's Big Tree
 Study Conducted by The Native Tree Society

Individual conifers
Taxodium
Works Progress Administration in Florida
2010s individual tree deaths
Individual trees in Florida
Oldest trees
Longwood, Florida